Precious Uzoaru Dede (born 18 January 1980) is a Nigerian retired footballer who played as a goalkeeper. She formerly played for several clubs including Delta Queens FC, Ibom Queens and Arna-Bjørnar, as well as appearing 99 times for the Nigeria women's national football team.

Club career
On 30 March 2009 Dede signed a one-year contract to play for Arna-Bjørnar in Bergen, Norway. She had been brought in following an injury to fellow goalkeeper Erika Skarbø.

International career
Dede has been in many Nigerian squads over the years, including the Women's World Cup tournaments of 2003, 2007, 2011, 2015, the Olympic tournaments of Sydney 2000, Athens 2004 and Beijing 2008, and the African Women's Championship tournaments of 2008, 2010, 2012 and 2014, winning it twice (2010, 2014).

Retirement
She had initially considered retiring from international football following the 2014 African Women's Championship, but was convinced to continue playing through the 2015 World Cup. Following the tournament, she announced her retirement in March 2016, having played 99 games for the senior national team. At the time of her retirement, she had been the longest serving player for the squad, and had recently been dropped from the team for the qualification tournament for the 2016 Summer Olympics.

She decided to fully retire from professional football in October that year, saying "I cherish the opportunity to play at club level and represent my country, it was a dream come true. I am very grateful to have spent over a decade in female football, I owe so much to the best game in the world."

Honours

International
 Nigeria
 African Women's Championship (2): 2010, 2014

References

External links
 
 

1980 births
Living people
Sportspeople from Lagos
Nigerian women's footballers
Nigeria women's international footballers
Women's association football goalkeepers
Arna-Bjørnar players
Olympic footballers of Nigeria
2003 FIFA Women's World Cup players
2007 FIFA Women's World Cup players
Footballers at the 2004 Summer Olympics
Footballers at the 2008 Summer Olympics
Nigerian expatriate women's footballers
Expatriate women's footballers in Norway
Nigerian expatriate sportspeople in Norway
Toppserien players
2011 FIFA Women's World Cup players
2015 FIFA Women's World Cup players
Delta Queens F.C. players
21st-century Nigerian women